Biedaszki  is a village in the administrative district of Gmina Węgorzewo, within Węgorzewo County, Warmian-Masurian Voivodeship, in north-eastern Poland. It is located in the region of Masuria, close to the border with the Kaliningrad Oblast of Russia.

The village was founded in 1558.

References

Villages in Węgorzewo County
1558 establishments in Poland
Populated places established in 1558